Emiliano Martínez Toranza (born 17 August 1999) is a Uruguayan professional footballer who plays as a midfielder for Danish Superliga club FC Midtjylland.

Career
Martínez started his youth football career with Charruitas and joined Nacional later. He was part of Nacional's 2018 U-20 Copa Libertadores winning squad. He made his professional debut for the club on 16 September 2019 in a 4–1 league win against Liverpool Montevideo. On 30 August 2021, Brazilian club Red Bull Bragantino announced the signing of Martínez on a five-year deal.

On 31 August 2022, Martínez joined Danish Superliga club Midtjylland on a season long loan deal with a purchase option. On 16 November 2022, he signed a contract until June 2027 with the club after they exercised their option to buy him on a permanent basis.

Career statistics

Honours
Nacional
Uruguayan Primera División: 2019, 2020
Supercopa Uruguaya: 2021

Nacional U20
U-20 Copa Libertadores: 2018

Individual
 Uruguayan Primera División Team of the Year: 2020

References

External links
 Profile at the FC Midtjylland website
 

1999 births
Living people
Association football midfielders
Uruguayan footballers
Uruguayan Primera División players
Campeonato Brasileiro Série A players
Danish Superliga players
Club Nacional de Football players
Red Bull Bragantino players
FC Midtjylland players
Uruguayan expatriate footballers
Uruguayan expatriate sportspeople in Brazil
Uruguayan expatriate sportspeople in Denmark
Expatriate footballers in Brazil
Expatriate men's footballers in Denmark